SC Sokil (SC Falcons) is a Ukrainian rugby club in Lviv.

History
The club was founded in 1977.

Players

Current squad

External links
 SC Sokil on Ukrainian Rugby Portal

Rugby clubs established in 1977
Ukrainian rugby union teams
Sport in Lviv